is a Japanese illustrator, animator, filmmaker, and manga artist. His animated works have included The Glassy Ocean, Ursa Minor Blue and Phantasmagoria. He has also contributed to the now-defunct manga magazine Garo.

Filmography

1993 —  Ursa Minor Blue – Directed

1998 — Glassy Ocean – Directed

1999 — A Piece of Phantasmagoria – Directed

External links
Tamura Shigeru Studio
Shigeru Tamura - My Favorite Artist
"Buried Treasure: Glassy Ocean"

Living people
Manga artists
1949 births